Saurita perspicua is a moth in the subfamily Arctiinae. It was described by Schaus in 1905. It is found in Trinidad.

References

Natural History Museum Lepidoptera generic names catalog

Moths described in 1905
Saurita